The Center for Media Freedom and Responsibility (CMFR) is a private, non-stock, non-profit foundation in the Philippines that has focused its endeavor on press freedom protection along with the establishment of a framework of responsibility for its practice. Its programs represent efforts to protect the press as well as to promote professional and ethical values in journalistic practice.

History 
The formation of the Center for Media Freedom and Responsibility (CMFR) addresses one of the critical concerns confronting the Philippines after People Power toppled the Marcos dictatorship in February 1986. That concern called attention to the power of the media and the role of the free press in the development of Philippine democracy.

All over the world, press freedom has been found to be essential to the democratic system. Effective participatory government is possible only when it can count on a well-informed society where individuals freely exchange ideas, and public debate and discussion arise from knowledge and understanding of national affairs.

That freedom involves not only media professionals, but also the public served by the media—public officials, the private sector, civil society groups, readers, viewers, and listeners—who receive information and are a part of the cycle of public communication. But freedom of the press, like all liberties, has its limits, for the simplest reason that it is vulnerable to abuse.

Democratic recovery confronts serious obstacles on the media front. The press and the media need to exert special efforts to measure up a collective vehicle of information, and as an instrument for clarifying complex issues and dilemmas of development that the public should understand.

Against this background, CMFR was organized in 1989 as a private, non-stock, non-profit organization involving the different sectors of society in the task of building up the press and news media as a pillar of democratic society. Its programs uphold press freedom, promote responsible journalism, and encourage journalistic excellence.

Objectives 
 To protect and strengthen the press as a pillar of democracy
 To establish a framework of responsibility and ethics in the practice of the press
 To raise levels of competence for coverage of special areas of news
 To promote journalistic excellence
 To engage different sectors of society in the growth of a quality press in the Philippines
 To promote media literacy and create awareness on the public's need for information

Program of activities

Media monitoring 
With content analysis, CMFR evaluates media coverage of major issues and events, such as elections and corruption. Based on its findings, CMFR has recommended measures to improve media performance.

In addition to special projects based on content analysis, PJR Reports includes case studies of media performance.

PJR and PJR Reports 
The Philippine Journalism Review (PJR), which was previously in magazine form, was revived in 2007 as a refereed journal for students and professors of journalism. PJR Reports is its monthly sister publication addressed to journalism professionals.

PJR Reports is not just a publication; it is the result of a continuing monitoring activity of how the press covers and reports events and issues. PJR Reports meets the need for the continuing education of journalists. Sent to over 500 journalists nationwide, PJR Reports also serves as a regular forum for the discussion of the issues and problems of the news media in the Philippines. PJR Reports serves as a reference for journalism faculty and students in universities and colleges.

PJR Reports was first released as a quarterly and then as a bimonthly journal. It is now released monthly to make the material more accessible to the public.

Jaime V. Ongpin Awards for Excellence in Journalism (JVOAEJ) 
CMFR holds the Jaime V. Ongpin Awards for Excellence in Journalism (JVOAEJ) yearly to promote the practice of investigative journalism and explanatory reporting. These involve basic building blocks for any kind of reporting: research, inquiry, and corroboration to ensure the validity of one's findings. CMFR serves as the technical and administrative secretariat of the awards.

In 1995, the program initiated the first Jaime V. Ongpin Journalism Seminar on Investigative Journalism in order to broaden public interest and support for the development of investigative journalism. The seminar, now known as the Jaime V. Ongpin Journalism Seminar, invites journalism students and faculty from different schools to interact with a panel of finalists who discuss their articles and views on journalism.

Freedom Watch 
CMFR monitors attacks against and threats to press freedom in the Philippines. It maintains a database of journalists killed in the line of duty and trains a national network of journalists to report on assaults against the press. Correspondents provide updates on unsolved cases of journalists killed and issue calls for action when necessary. CMFR serves as a clearing house for information to international groups.

CMFR forwards alerts and reports on the state of press freedom in the Philippines to the Southeast Asian Press Alliance (SEAPA), the International Freedom of Expression eXchange (IFEX), Reporters Without Borders (RSF), and the Committee to Protect Journalists (CPJ).

Journalism Asia 
A yearly publication that reports on the state of the press and the issues affecting media in Asia. Contributors are media practitioners from the region who gather for a conference (the Journalism Asia Forum) to discuss selected issues that will be taken up in the magazine.

Books and other publications 
CMFR also publishes reports and books on major topics of media interest and performance such as media and gender issues and media and governance.

Books 

 Libel as Politics
 Philippine Press Freedom Report 2004, 2007, 2008, 2009, and 2010
 The CMFR Monitor: News Media Coverage of the 2010 Campaign and Elections
 The CMFR Monitor: News Media Coverage of the 2007 National Elections
 Philippine Press Freedom Primer: Quick Answers to your Questions
 The CMFR Ethics Manual: A Values Approach to News Media Ethics
 Limited Protection: Press Freedom and Philippine Law
 Citizens’ Media Monitor: A Report on the Campaign and Elections Coverage in the Philippines 2004
 Journalist Killings under the Arroyo administration 2001-2006: A Study by the Center for Media Freedom and Responsibility
 Prize Journalism: A collection of Jaime V. Ongpin Award Winners
 Press Freedom in the Philippines: A Study in Contradictions
 The Media and Peace Reporting
 Five Source Books on Women:
 Understanding Women and Politics
 Understanding Population and Development
 Understanding Women, Work, and Migration
 Understanding Violence Against Women
 Understanding Reproductive Health
 Peace Process and Media

Manuals 

 Peace Journalism Training Manual
 Monitoring Media Coverage of Elections: A Center for Media Freedom and Responsibility (CMFR) Guidebook
 Media in Court: The Criminal Justice System Guidebook for Reporters
 Reporting Public Policy: A Manual for Journalists
 Journalists’ Safety: Involving Media Owners

Conference Reports 

 The Manila Conference on Impunity and Press Freedom
 Access to Economic Information
 Corruption in Media: A Multi-Sectoral Perspective
 Freedom of Economic Information for Effective Governance
 News Media and Civil Society
 The Road Beyond EDSA: The Post-Estrada Reform Agenda
 Media and Local Government: Corruption and Access to Information
CMFR has developed training modules in the following areas:
 Campus Journalism
 Media and Civil Society
 Media and Corruption
 Media and Disaster
 Media and Economic Information
 Media and Judiciary
 Media and Peace
 Media and Public Policy
 Media and Women

Press Councils 
CMFR has been working with partners in the press, academe, and non-governmental organizations to plan, build, and launch local press councils since 2001. To date, it has helped establish the Cebu Citizens-Press Council and regional press councils in Baguio and Palawan.

Network 
CMFR is a founding member of the Freedom Fund for Filipino Journalists (FFFJ) and currently serves as its secretariat. It is also a founding member of the Southeast Asian Press Alliance (SEAPA) and an International Freedom of Expression Exchange (IFEX) member.

Awards 
CMFR is a recipient of the Catholic Mass Media Award for Public Service in 1993 and the Joaquin "Chino" Roces Award in 1998. In 2005, CMFR won second prize in the ethics and values category of the Templeton Freedom Awards of the United States-based Atlas Economic Research Foundation.

Officers 
 Executive Director
 Melinda Quintos de Jesus
 Deputy Director/PJR Reports Editor
 Luis V. Teodoro
 Board of Directors
 Dr. Jose Abueva
 Fr. Joaquin Bernas, S.J.
 Atty. Fulgencio Factoran Jr.
 Melinda Quintos de Jesus
 Maribel Ongpin
 Tina Monzon-Palma
 Paulynn Paredes-Sicam
 Vergel O. Santos
 Luis V. Teodoro

Recent events 
On January 28, 2008, 30 journalists filed a P10-million media class suit (by the National Union of Journalists of the Philippines, Center for Media Freedom and Responsibility (CMFR), and Philippine Press Institute (PPI). Executive Judge Winlove Dumayas of Makati Regional Trial Court Branch 59 granted the petition for a temporary restraining order, effective for 72 hours.

See also 
 Reporters Without Borders
 Committee to Protect Journalists
 Cebu Citizens-Press Council

References

External links 
 CMFR website

Communications and media organizations based in the Philippines
Political advocacy groups in the Philippines
Freedom of expression organizations
Organizations established in 1989